Tecticornia australasica, also known as grey samphire, is found in intermittent patches across tropical coastal regions of Australia.

External links
Online Field guide to Common Saltmarsh Plants of Queensland

australasica
Taxa named by Paul G. Wilson